Barsil (also Romanized as Barsīl) is a village in Dasturan Rural District, in the Central District of Joghatai County, Razavi Khorasan Province, Iran. At the 2006 census, its population was 13, in 6 families.

References 

Populated places in Joghatai County